Gallaudet fascia or Gallaudet's fascia may refer to:
Fascia of perineum
Buck's fascia